The Women's Team event at the 2010 South American Games was held on March 22.

Medalists

Results

Round Robin

Contests

References

 Summary

Wteam
South American Games 2010
South American Games Wteam